John Chester Murray, MBE (31 December 1915 – 25 January 2009) was an Australian politician.

Murray was born in Melbourne, the illegitimate son of a member of the prominent Chaffey family of Mildura, but raised in Sydney. He was educated at The King's School, Parramatta until forced to withdraw due to the Great Depression, after which he worked as a jackeroo, miner and drover for several years. In 1939, he enlisted for service in World War II with the Second Australian Imperial Force, serving with the 2/13th Battalion, 20th Brigade. He served in North Africa, becoming one of The Rats of Tobruk, and later in New Guinea and Borneo, rising to infantry section leader and intelligence officer. He leased his first grazing property, "Gidgee" in far western New South Wales in 1946, and bought his first property, "The Orient" in north Queensland, in 1951. As a grazier, he was a strong supporter of introducing Brahman cattle to north Queensland.

In 1958, Murray was elected to the Australian House of Representatives as the member for Herbert, having received the endorsement of both the Liberal Party and the Country Party. Once elected he sat as a Liberal. In federal parliament, he sat on the defence and foreign affairs committees. He was defeated in 1961, but in 1963 was elected to the Legislative Assembly of Queensland as the member for Clayfield, where he remained until 1976.

Murray died on the Gold Coast on 25 January 2009.

References

Liberal Party of Australia members of the Parliament of Australia
Members of the Australian House of Representatives for Herbert
Members of the Australian House of Representatives
Members of the Queensland Legislative Assembly
Australian Members of the Order of the British Empire
1915 births
2009 deaths
People from North Queensland
Liberal Party of Australia members of the Parliament of Queensland
20th-century Australian politicians
Australian Army personnel of World War II
Australian Army officers
Politicians from Sydney